Pietrzykowice  is a village in the administrative district of Gmina Kąty Wrocławskie, within Wrocław County, Lower Silesian Voivodeship, in south-western Poland. Pietrzykowice is located approximately 15 km south west of Wrocław.

The village has a population of 512.

History
In the 10th century the area became part of the emerging Polish state, and later on, it was part of Poland, Bohemia, Prussia, and Germany. Under German rule, the name was initially Polnisch Peterwitz and later changed to Petersweiler to erase traces of Polish origin. During World War II, the Germans operated the E303 forced labour subcamp of the Stalag VIII-B/344 prisoner-of-war camp for Allied POWs at the local sugar factory. After the defeat of Germany in the war, in 1945, the village became again part of Poland and its historic name was restored.

A sugar factory was once located in Pietrzykowice. However this factory has since been demolished. The factory processed sugar beet which was grown on farms in area around Pietrzykowice.

Transport
The Voivodeship road 347 passes through the village, and the A4 motorway runs nearby, south of the village.

References

Pietrzykowice